Aberdeen F.C. competed in the Scottish Premier Division, Scottish Cup and Scottish League Cup in the 1992–93 season. The club led by Willie Miller in his first full season as manager finished second in the league and lost to Rangers in both cup finals. It was also the first time since season 1976–77 that the Dons had not played in European competition after finishing 6th in the league the previous season.

Results

Scottish Premier Division

Final standings

Scottish League Cup

Scottish Cup

References

afcheritage.org 

Aberdeen F.C. seasons
Aberdeen